Pascale Grand (born August 12, 1967 in Montreal, Quebec) is a retired female racewalker from Canada. She set her personal best in the women's 10 km race walk event (45:46) in 1991.

Achievements

References

External links
 
 
 
 
 

1967 births
Athletes (track and field) at the 1992 Summer Olympics
Canadian female racewalkers
Living people
Olympic track and field athletes of Canada
World Athletics Championships athletes for Canada
Athletes from Montreal